The Ivanov reaction is the chemical reaction of the dianions (endiolates) of aryl acetic acids (Ivanov reagents) with electrophiles, primarily carbonyl compounds or isocyanates. The reaction was named after the Bulgarian organic chemist, Academician Dimitar Ivanov, who discovered it.

Ivanov reagents (dianions of aryl acetic acids) react with many electrophiles, including aldehydes, ketones, isocyanates, and alkyl halides.  The product does not usually spontaneously decarboxylate, but it is possible with some reagents.

The Ivanov reaction is known to proceed through the Zimmerman-Traxler model transition state.  Toulec et al. have investigated the reaction rates and kinetics.

See also
 Aldol reaction

References
  Ivanov, D.; Spassoff, A. Bull. Soc. Chim. France 1931, 49, 19 & 375. 
  Ivanov, D. et al. Bull. Soc. Chim. France 1932, 51, 1321 & 1325 & 1331. 
  Blagoev, B.; Ivanov, D. Synthesis 1970, 615–627. (Review)
  Ivanov, D. Synthesis 1975, 83–98. (Review)
  
  
  Toullec, J.; Mladenova, M.; Gaudemar-Bardone, F.; Blagoev, B. J. Org. Chem. 1985, 50, 2563.

Addition reactions
Carbon-carbon bond forming reactions
Name reactions